Delyn can refer to:

Delyn (district), a former district of Wales
Delyn (UK Parliament constituency), a constituency based on the district
Delyn (Senedd constituency), a constituency based on the district
Ezhimala, known in older times as Delyn, a hill in Kerala, India
Payyanur, also known as Delyn in older times after the nearby hill, a seaport in Kerala, India